Beyond the Law may refer to:

Beyond the Law (1918 film), an American western film directed by Theodore Marston
Beyond the Law (1930 film), an American western film directed by J. P. McGowan
Beyond the Law (1934 film), an American western film directed by D. Ross Lederman
Beyond the Law (1968 American film), a police film by Norman Mailer
Beyond the Law (1968 Italian film), a Spaghetti Western starring Lee Van Cleef
Beyond the Law (1992 film), an American TV movie starring Charlie Sheen
Beyond the Law, a novel in the Hardy Boys Casefiles series
Beyond the Law (2019 film), an American action film directed by James Cullen Bressack

See also
 Above the Law (disambiguation)
 Outside the Law (disambiguation)